Víctor Hugo Carrillo Casanova (born 30 October 1975) is a Peruvian football referee who is a listed international referee for FIFA since 2005.

Career 
Víctor Hugo is a referee in Peruvian Primera División, Copa Libertadores, Copa Sudamericana, 2010 FIFA World Cup, and several South American qualifiers, international friendly matches and in the Copa Perú, when he refereed a match between Los Caimanes against Universitario (Trujillo) in Chiclayo. He participated in the 2010 FIFA Club World Cup in United Arab Emirates. He served on the panel of referees who were at the 2011 FIFA U-17 World Cup.

He was selected among the 10 pre-ranked South American referees to lead at the 2014 FIFA World Cup.

References

1975 births
Living people
Peruvian football referees
Copa América referees